The 1965 USC Trojans football team represented the University of Southern California (USC) in the 1965 NCAA University Division football season. In their sixth year under head coach John McKay, the Trojans compiled a 7–2–1 record (4–1 against conference opponents), finished in second place in the Athletic Association of Western Universities (AAWU or Pac-8), and outscored their opponents by a combined total of 262 to 92. The team was ranked #10 in the final AP Poll and #9 in the final Coaches Poll.

Quarterback Troy Winslow led the team in passing, completing 78 of 128 passes for 1,019 yards with 11 touchdowns and 9 interceptions.  Mike Garrett won the Heisman Trophy and led the team in rushing with 267 carries for 1,440 yards and 13 touchdowns. Dave Moton led the team in receiving with 29 catches for 493 yards and five touchdowns.

Schedule

Game summaries

UCLA

Mike Garrett 40 rushes, 210 yards

Wyoming

Statistics
Receiving: David Moton 5 receptions, 181 yards, 3 TD

1965 team players in the NFL
The following players were drafted into professional football following the season.

Awards and honors
 Mike Garrett, Heisman Trophy

References

USC
USC Trojans football seasons
USC Trojans football